Cochise is a feature on Earth's Moon, a crater in Taurus-Littrow valley.  Astronauts Eugene Cernan and Harrison Schmitt landed southwest of it in 1972, on the Apollo 17 mission.  They drove along its rim in the rover during EVA 3, but did not stop.

To the southwest are Shakespeare and Van Serg, and to the northeast is Bowen and Geology Station 8 at the base of the Sculptured Hills.

The crater was named by the astronauts after Cochise, Chief of the Chiricahua Apache.

References

External links
43D1S2(25) Apollo 17 Traverses at Lunar and Planetary Institute
Geological Investigation of the Taurus-Littrow Valley: Apollo 17 Landing Site

Impact craters on the Moon
Apollo 17